La Serena may refer to:

Places
 La Serena, Chile
 La Serena, Colombia
 La Serena, Spain
 La Serena, winter home of William Jennings Bryan in Coconut Grove, Miami, Florida

Other uses
 La Serena (cheese)
 Deportes La Serena, a football club based in La Serena, Chile

See also
 Serena (disambiguation)